Eretmodus is a genus of cichlids endemic to Lake Tanganyika in East Africa.

Species
There are currently two recognized species in this genus:
 Eretmodus cyanostictus Boulenger, 1898 (Tanganyika Clown)
 Eretmodus marksmithi W. E. Burgess, 2012

References

 
Eretmodini
Fish of Africa
Taxa named by George Albert Boulenger
Cichlid genera